Drea is a town and commune in Souk Ahras Province in north-eastern Algeria.

Drea may also refer to:
 Christine Drea (active from 1984), Morocco-born American biologist and ecologist
 Drea de Matteo (born 1972), American actress
 Drea Kelly (born 1974), American actress also known as Andrea Kelly
 Edward J. Drea (born 1944), American military historian
 Seán Drea (born 1947), Irish former rower
 William Drea Adams (active from 1972), American educator and advocate for the humanities

See also
 MS Moby Drea, a cruiseferry launched 1975